Songs of Freedom is a four-disc box set containing music by Bob Marley and the Wailers, from Marley's first song "Judge Not", recorded in 1961, to a live version of "Redemption Song", recorded in 1980 at his last concert.

The song "Iron Lion Zion" was first released on this compilation, in what is often considered the original mix (although the original is said to not have included the harmony vocals from the I-Threes). The single releases (and subsequent compilation releases) use a remix which was created for the single using modern production, which sounds very different.

"Why Should I" was remixed for this compilation and released as a single. The original wasn't released until the JAD/Universal box set Man To Man in 2004. The original was recorded in 1971 and features Peter Tosh and Bunny Wailer's backing vocals, which were replaced by The I-Threes on the remix.

It is said to be complementary to the greatest hits compilation Legend, in the sense that any of the tracks with the same names are presented in different versions from the normal single mixes on Legend - as an example see the number of 12" mixes in the track listing below. The exception is the original version of "Get Up, Stand Up".

Track listing

Disc one

Disc two

Disc three

Disc four

Charts

References

External links
Booklet corrections by Roger Steffens

Bob Marley and the Wailers compilation albums
1992 compilation albums
Island Records compilation albums
Tuff Gong albums